Ann(e) or Annie James may refer to:

Ann James, author and illustrator
Anne James (actress) in Barbed Wire (1952 film)
Ann James (artist), English-born Canadian artist
Anne James (International Justice Project), honoured in 2006 New Year Honours
Annie James, character in The Parent Trap (1998 film)

See also
Anne Scott-James
Anna James (disambiguation)